Placostylus hongii is a species of very large, air-breathing land snail, a terrestrial pulmonate gastropod mollusc in the family Bothriembryontidae.

Description
The length of the shell attains 75 mm.

Distribution 
This species is endemic and occurs in New Zealand.

Conservation status
Placostylus hongii is classified by the New Zealand Department of Conservation as Range Restricted.

Buckley et al. (2011) from short sequence molecular phylogeny and shell dimensions, that there are no subspecies of Placostylus hongii.

References

 Pfeiffer, L. (1861). Diagnosen einiger Landschnecken von Neuseeland. Malakozoologische Blätter, 8: 146–150. Cassel.

External links
 Lesson, R. P. (1830–1831). Voyage autour du monde, exécuté par ordre du Roi, sur la corvette de Sa Majesté, La Coquille, pendant les années 1822, 1823, 1824 et 1825. Zoologie, 2(1): 1–471 [pp. 1–24 (1830), 25–471 (1831)] Paris: Arthus Bertrand.

hongii
Gastropods described in 1830
Taxa named by René Lesson